Charleval is the name of 2 communes in France:

 Charleval, Bouches-du-Rhône, in the Bouches-du-Rhône department
 Charleval, Eure, in the Eure department